Grajaú is a municipality in the Brazilian state of Maranhão. Founded on 29 April 1811, its population in 2020 was of 70,065. The total area is 8,864 km2.

It is one of the most important city in the south of the State. In Grajaú are located several industries of Plaster of Paris, as well as gypsum mining for other purposes (drywall, etc.). The city is the seat of the Roman Catholic Diocese of Grajaú.

References

Municipalities in Maranhão